Lu Hsueh-mei (born 13 November 1987 in Kaohsiung) is a Taiwanese softball player. She competed for Chinese Taipei at the 2008 Summer Olympics.

References

Living people
1987 births
Olympic softball players of Taiwan
Taiwanese softball players
Softball players at the 2008 Summer Olympics
Sportspeople from Kaohsiung
Asian Games medalists in softball
Softball players at the 2006 Asian Games
Softball players at the 2010 Asian Games
Softball players at the 2014 Asian Games
Medalists at the 2006 Asian Games
Medalists at the 2010 Asian Games
Medalists at the 2014 Asian Games
Asian Games silver medalists for Chinese Taipei
Asian Games bronze medalists for Chinese Taipei